The Hotel Monte Vista is a historic hotel near U.S. Route 66 in Flagstaff, Arizona.

History
Hotel Monte Vista was built in 1927 and is in the historic downtown district of Flagstaff. It has 73 rooms and suites on three floors. Many famous people have stayed at the hotel, including John Wayne, Spencer Tracy, Humphrey Bogart, Clark Gable, Anthony Hopkins, Esther Williams, and Barbara Stanwyck.

The hotel is located at 100 North San Francisco Street. The Monte Vista Lounge, or "Monte V" as it is known, is a popular bar and entertainment venue.

Hauntings
There have been many alleged ghost sightings at the Hotel Monte Vista. One of the sightings involves a "Phantom Bell Boy" that knocks on guests' doors in the middle of the night and will talk to the guest.

In popular culture

Film
The hotel was a filming location for the 1942 American romantic drama Casablanca.

Television
Hotel Monte Vista was featured as a haunted location on the paranormal TV series, Most Terrifying Places which aired on the Travel Channel in 2019.

References

External links
 Official Website
 Famous Guests

Buildings and structures in Flagstaff, Arizona
Hotels in Arizona